Philip V. McHarris (born December 4, 1992) is an American academic at Yale University and writer.

McHarris has been a frequent contributor for The New York Times, The Washington Post, Al Jazeera, and Essence regarding issues related to race, policing, housing, and social inequality. He has appeared on HBO, CNN, PBS, ABC News, and MSNBC. His commentary has also been featured in Time, the Los Angeles Times, and MTV.

McHarris has keynoted and spoken at universities across the country, including Harvard University, Iona College, Boston College, Yale University Art Gallery, and Princeton University.
McHarris was also the recipient of the Boston College 31st Martin Luther King Jr. Memorial Award. In 2020, he was selected as one of the Root 100 most influential African Americans.

Early life and education 
McHarris was born in Bronx, New York, and grew up in Newark, New Jersey. McHarris attended high school at Saint Benedict's Preparatory School and received his Bachelor of Arts degree in sociology from Boston College. McHarris received a Master of Arts in sociology and African American studies from Yale University and a Master of Philosophy in sociology and African American studies from Yale University. He also attended Princeton University as a PhD exchange scholar. Philip McHarris is currently a PhD candidate at Yale University in sociology and African American studies. McHarris' academic research focuses on race, policing, housing, inequality, and mass incarceration.

Media 
McHarris has frequently written and provided commentary on politics and social issues in news media outlets.  He has appeared on CNN, PBS, ABC News, MSNBC, and Axios on HBO. His commentary has also been featured on BBC, Time, NPR, and NBC.

McHarris has been a frequent contributor for The New York Times, The Washington Post, Slate, Al Jazeera, and Essence. His commentary has also appeared in Time, CNN, the Los Angeles Times, and MTV.

Politics and activism 
McHarris has been an advocate of the Black Lives Matter movement and efforts to end police violence. He has advocated for divesting from policing and reinvesting funds into community resources and alternative safety and emergency response systems.

In 2012 while an undergraduate student at Boston College, McHarris organized a student rally (along with Ben St. Gerard) following the killing of Trayvon Martin two months earlier. In 2015 McHarris was a co-founder of the NYC chapter of BYP100, an African American youth organization in the United States with the main focus on community organizing, voter mobilization, and other social justice campaigns.

Publications and works

External links

References 

1992 births
Activists for African-American civil rights
Black studies scholars
American political writers
Politics and race in the United States
Black Lives Matter people
Yale University alumni
Living people
Multiracial affairs in the United States
Morrissey College of Arts & Sciences alumni
Criticism of police brutality
People from Newark, New Jersey
St. Benedict's Preparatory School alumni